Cole River or (Coles River) may refer to:

 Cole River flowing from Dighton, Massachusetts through Swansea, Massachusetts to Mount Hope Bay
 Cole Brook, a short stream flowing from Rehoboth, Massachusetts into the Cole River
 Coles Brook flowing from Rehoboth, Massachusetts through Seekonk, Massachusetts to the Ten Mile River